The African Light Source (AfLS) – as of December 2022 – is the initiative to build the first Pan-African synchrotron light source. The initiative is currently led – separately – by the African Light Source (AfLS) Foundation and the Africa Synchrotron Initiative (ASI).

Rationale 
There are more than 70 light sources, including about 30 high and medium energy synchrotrons, scattered globally but Africa is the only continent without any synchrotron light source facility. Likewise, there is a growing need for innovation to address the challenges that impact the lives of many Africans today. Meeting these challenges calls for investment in science, technology and innovation, including large-scale research infrastructure. To help answer this need, the idea for an African light source has been discussed  at least since 2000. 

African scientists and nations participate in the ESRF and Sesame light source, respectively. Such participation provides access to the facilities for researchers, and capacity building and training across many aspects of synchrotron operation and technologies. 

In December 2017, Diamond Light Source, UK established the Synchrotron Techniques for African Research and Technology (START) with a £3.7 million funded by the UK Research and Innovation for 3 years. START aimed to provide access to African researchers with focus on energy materials and structural biology.

Leaders

African Light Source Foundation 
In November 2015, the First AfLS Conference was held with 98 delegates from 13 African nations at the European Synchrotron Radiation Facility (ESRF), Grenoble, France. The conference led to the Grenoble Resolutions which encapsulate the formation of the AfLS Steering Committee, AfLS Roadmap and the creation of the AfLS Foundation, registered in South Africa.  The AfLS Foundation is chaired by Simon Connell and is received supported by Nana Akufo-Addo, Ghana president, who championing the project. Since the first conference, there have been two further conferences. The AfLS Foundation is actively working upon the Conceptual Design Report (CDR) for a light source in Africa.

Africa Synchrotron Initiative 
In 2018, during the 32nd African Union meeting, in Addis Ababa, the African Union’s executive council called on its member states to support a pan-African synchrotron. Subsequently, the Africa Synchrotron Initiative (ASI) was formed in 2019 by the African Academy of Sciences (AAS), and is chaired by Shaaban Khalil.

Scrutiny 

 As of October 2022, the two organisations (AfLS foundation and ASI) are not merging their efforts which makes governance a challenge since there are members who are part of the two organisations.

 AfLS is estimated to cost 1 billion US dollars to be realised and $100 million for annual running costs. The ability of African nations to fund the project has been questioned since they struggle to fund national projects.

References

External Links 

 African Light Source foundation
 Africa Synchrotron Initiative
 Momentum grows for the African Light Source by Prof. Simon Connell, Youtube

Synchrotron radiation facilities
Research institutes in Africa
International research institutes